And Justice for None is the seventh studio album by American heavy metal band Five Finger Death Punch. It was released on May 18, 2018, and was preceded by two singles released in December 2017 on their first greatest hits record. It is the last album to be released through Prospect Park and the last album to feature founding drummer Jeremy Spencer, who departed the band in December 2018.

Background 
The band had already completed recording of the album by December 31, 2016. However, due to ongoing problems with their label Prospect Park, the album was delayed until 2018 after they reached negotiations with the label. After negotiations were reached in late 2017, they released the greatest hits compilation A Decade of Destruction and two new songs entitled "Trouble" and a cover of The Offspring song "Gone Away" recorded for the new album, were included on the compilation, with "Trouble" being featured on the deluxe version of the new album, which also features a different album cover than the standard  edition.

Reception 
At the 2019 Bandit Rock Awards ceremony, And Justice for None won Best International Album.

Track listing

Personnel 
 Ivan Moody – vocals, piano on "Gone Away"
 Zoltan Bathory – rhythm guitar
 Jason Hook – lead guitar, backing vocals
 Jeremy Spencer – drums, percussion
 Chris Kael – bass, backing vocals

Charts

Weekly charts

Year-end charts

Certifications

References 

2018 albums
Five Finger Death Punch albums
Albums produced by Kevin Churko
Nu metal albums by American artists